Yale Secondary is a public high school in Abbotsford, British Columbia part of School District 34 Abbotsford. There are approximately 1250 full-time students in grades 9 through 12. The current principal of the school is Rob Sloboda.

History
Yale Junior Secondary School was founded in 1971 for students in grade 9 through 11 and touted as a "new and modern school."

Notable alumni
Jarrod and Jamie Bacon of the Bacon Brothers (gangsters), gangsters
Victoria Duffield, musician
Marek Klassen, basketball player
Jake Virtanen, hockey player

References

External links
Yale Secondary School

High schools in Abbotsford, British Columbia